Macrogyrus is a genus of beetles in the family Gyrinidae, containing the following species:

 Macrogyrus aenescens (Régimbart, 1882)
 Macrogyrus albertisi (Régimbart, 1882)
 Macrogyrus angustatus Régimbart, 1883
 Macrogyrus australis (Brullé, 1835)
 Macrogyrus blanchardi Régimbart, 1883
 Macrogyrus caledonicus (Fauvel, 1867)
 Macrogyrus canaliculatus Frogatt, 1907
 Macrogyrus convexus Ochs, 1937
 Macrogyrus darlingtoni Ochs, 1949
 Macrogyrus elongatus Régimbart, 1883
 Macrogyrus finschi Ochs, 1925
 Macrogyrus gibbosus Ochs, 1956
 Macrogyrus gouldii (Hope, 1842)
 Macrogyrus heurni Ochs, 1955
 Macrogyrus howittii (Clark, 1864)
 Macrogyrus latior Tillyard, 1926
 Macrogyrus leechi Mouchamps, 1951
 Macrogyrus leopoldi Ball, 1932
 Macrogyrus loriai Ochs, 1955
 Macrogyrus oberthueri Régimbart, 1883
 Macrogyrus obliquatus (Aubé, 1838)
 Macrogyrus oblongus (Boisduval, 1835)
 Macrogyrus obsoletus Régimbart, 1907
 Macrogyrus oratus 
 Macrogyrus orthocolobus Heller, 1914
 Macrogyrus ovatus Ochs, 1934
 Macrogyrus paradoxus Régimbart, 1883
 Macrogyrus purpurascens Régimbart, 1883
 Macrogyrus reichei (Aubé, 1838)
 Macrogyrus reticulatus Régimbart, 1899
 Macrogyrus rivularis (Clark, 1863)
 Macrogyrus sexangularis Régimbart, 1907
 Macrogyrus striolatus (Guérin-Meneville, 1830)
 Macrogyrus sumbawae (Régimbart, 1882)
 Macrogyrus toxopeusi Ochs, 1955
 Macrogyrus variegatus Régimbart, 1907
 Macrogyrus venator (Dejean, 1833)
 Macrogyrus viridisulcatus Mjöberg, 1916
 Macrogyrus wetarensis Ochs, 1953

References

Gyrinidae
Adephaga genera